Since 2010 the Swedish motor racing team Per Eklund Motorsport has competed in rallycross events: the FIA World Rallycross Championship, the FIA European Rallycross Championship and the Global Rallycross Championship. Drivers on the team include Per Eklund, Ramona Karlsson, Henning Solberg, Toomas Heikkinen, Alexander Hvaal and Samuel Hübinette.

Racing record

Complete FIA World Rallycross Championship results
(key)

Supercar

Complete FIA European Rallycross Championship results
(key)

Division 1

Supercar

* Season still in progress.

Complete Global RallyCross Championship results

Supercar

References

External links

 

Swedish auto racing teams
World Rallycross Championship teams
Global RallyCross Championship teams